After Midnight (formerly titled Something Else) is a 2019 American romantic monster film directed by Jeremy Gardner and Christian Stella and starring Jeremy Gardner and Brea Grant. The film follows Hank after his longtime girlfriend Abby leaves town unannounced, as he discovers that a mysterious creature has begun stalking him every night.

After Midnight premiered at the Tribeca Film Festival on April 26, 2019 under its former title Something Else. It was released in limited theaters and VOD platforms in the United States through Cranked Up Films on Feb 14, 2020.

Plot
After a ten year relationship, Hank's girlfriend leaves him. He spends his days in melancholy, but a terrible creature begins to come to his house at nights and scratches his door with obviously unkind intentions. Hank tries to confront the monster, simultaneously recalling a collapsed relationship and trying to understand what went wrong with it.

Cast
Jeremy Gardner as Hank
Brea Grant as Abby
Henry Zebrowski as Wade
Justin Benson as Shane
Ashley Song as Jess
Nicola Masciotra as Pam
Taylor Zaudtke as Jane
Keith Arbuthnot as the Creature

Critical reception
After Midnight received positive reviews from critics. The website's critics consensus reads: "Part creature feature, part romance, After Midnight somehow manages to combine its disparate ingredients and come up with something special."

Kristy Strouse at Film Inquiry praised the film, writing, "There’s an honesty in [After Midnight] that makes this man against (his) monsters story one that’ll give you deep meaning, beautiful cinematography, and just the right amount of WTF." Jennie Kermode at Eye for Film gave the film 4.5 out of 5 stars, describing it as a "winsome tale of thirtysomething angst, romance and existential terror [...] beautifully written and played."

References

External links

2019 horror films
American romantic horror films
American monster movies
2010s English-language films
2010s American films